Lieutenant General Sir John Guise Cowley,  (20 August 1905 – 7 January 1993) was a British Army officer and George Cross recipient who reached high rank in the 1950s.

Military career
Cowley was born at Mussoorie, North India, the son of an army chaplain. Returning to England as a baby, his early years were spent in a Dorset village, where his father was the rector. Educated at Wellington College and the Royal Military Academy, Woolwich, Cowley was commissioned into the Royal Engineers on 3 September 1925. He was promoted to lieutenant on 3 September 1927.

Posted to India, by 1935 Cowley was attached to the 16th Army Troops Company, 2nd Queen Victoria's Own Madras Sappers and Miners (now the Madras Engineer Group of the Indian Army) in Quetta. Here he was awarded the Albert Medal, subsequently exchanged for the George Cross, for his actions in rescuing survivors from the ruins of a collapsed hospital during the Quetta earthquake of May 1935.

Cowley was promoted to captain on 3 September 1936. From 16 November 1936 to 17 December 1938, he was an instructor at Woolwich. He served in the Second World War in the Middle East, Italy and North West Europe. He was promoted to major on 3 September 1942, and ended the war as a war-substantive lieutenant colonel and temporary brigadier, with promotion to colonel on 10 March 1949. In 1953 he became Chief of Staff at Headquarters Eastern Command, advancing to major-general in January 1954. He was then appointed Vice Quartermaster-General in 1956, Controller of Munitions at the Ministry of Supply in 1957 on promotion to lieutenant-general, and appointment to Master-General of the Ordnance in 1960; he retired in 1962.

Cowley's honours included appointment as an Officer of the Order of the British Empire (OBE) in 1943 and Commander (CBE) in 1946; Knight Commander of the Order of Orange-Nassau in 1947; Companion of the Order of the Bath (CB) in 1954; and promotion to Knight Commander of the Order of the British Empire (KBE) in 1958. He exchanged his Albert Medal for the George Cross in 1971. He was also Colonel Commandant of the Royal Pioneer Corps from 1961 to 1968.

In retirement, Cowley served as a director of a number of companies; as president of the New Forest Preservation Society and as chairman of the governors of Wellington College. He died of heart disease aged 87 on 7 January 1993 at Brockenhurst, Hampshire.

Family
In 1941 Cowley married Irene Sybil Millen and together they had one son and three daughters.

References

External links
The Papers of Lieutenant-General Sir John Cowley held at Churchill Archives Centre
Generals of World War II

 

1905 births
1993 deaths
British Army lieutenant generals
British Army brigadiers of World War II
Royal Engineers officers
Knights Commander of the Order of the British Empire
Companions of the Order of the Bath
Grand Officers of the Order of Orange-Nassau
People educated at Wellington College, Berkshire
Recipients of the Albert Medal (lifesaving)
Graduates of the Royal Military Academy, Woolwich
Academics of the Royal Military Academy, Woolwich
Military personnel of British India
British recipients of the George Cross
British people in colonial India